ADIC may refer to:

 Abu Dhabi Investment Council
 Advanced Digital Information Corporation
 ASEAN Defense Industry Collaboration
 Assistant director in charge
 -adic analysis
 -adic valuation